Roslyn Sulcas is a dance critic and culture writer for The New York Times. She was raised in Cape Town, South Africa, and studied English literature at university, receiving post-graduate degrees from the University of Cape Town and Paris VII (Jussieu). While finishing her thesis, she lived in Paris, where she began writing for the British Dance Theater Journal and became the Paris correspondent for Dance & Dancers, Dance Magazine and Dance International as well as writing frequently for other publications. In 1996, she moved to New York and worked as an editor at Saveur, Top Model, House & Garden and House Beautiful while continuing to write about dance. She began to review dance for The New York Times in 2005. In 2011, she moved to London. She writes about film, theatre and culture news as well as about dance for The New York Times.

External links 
 Roslyn Sulcas @ The New York Times
 Roslyn Sulcas' ArtBeat blog

American dance critics
American women journalists
The New York Times writers
Living people
Year of birth missing (living people)
21st-century American women